Xavier Institute of Management, Bhubaneswar (XIMB) is a premier Business School located in Bhubaneswar, the capital of the eastern Indian state of Odisha featuring regularly among the top 20 bschools in India. Established in the year 1987, XIMB is governed by the Government of India, the Government of Odisha, and the Society of Jesus (Jesuits). The school was founded under what the parties called a 'social contract' between the Government of Odisha and the Jesuits in Odisha, with Fr. Romuald D'Souza SJ being its founder-director. XIMB has been part of the exclusive Super League of B-Schools (Top-10) in India - the highest tier rated by All India Management Association (AIMA). XIMB was ranked 10th in the prestigious Dare2Compete India's Top 10 Competitive B-Schools 2022. The institute was also ranked 1st in the state of Orissa Education World B-schools ranking 2020-21. The institute is known to carry out research and development activities regularly in collaboration with government departments in the state. 

It is also the Centre of Excellence in Fiscal Policy and Taxation (CEFT) set up by the state government. With the establishment of XIM University , XIMB has become a constituent school under the university focusing exclusively on business management programmes. For admission into the MBA & EMBA programmes of the institution aspirants need to appear for CAT (conducted by IIMs), XAT (conducted by XLRI), GMAT (Conducted by GMAC) and XGMT (Conducted by XIM university). And, for the PhD programme in Business Management the standard admission procedure set by XIM University is followed by the institution.

Academics
The academic programmes offered by XIM university follow the global model for management education. XIMB confers MBA and PhD degrees through XIM University . Currently, XIMB offers MBA programmes in Business Management and Global Management, Executive MBA in Business Management and Business Analytics, and PhD programmes through XIM university. The PGDM programmes in Rural Management and Human Resource Management, previously offered by XIMB are now housed under two different schools of XIM University named as School of Rural Management (SRM) and School of Human Resource Management (SHRM).

Rankings 

XIMB has been part of the exclusive Super League of B-Schools (Top - 10) in India - the highest tier rated by All India Management Association (AIMA). XIMB was ranked 10th in the prestigious Dare2Compete India's Top 10 Competitive B-Schools 2022. The institute was also ranked 1st in the state of Orissa Education World B-schools ranking 2020-21.

International exchange
XIMB engages in the international exchange of faculty and students with the following institutions:
University of Stellenbosch Business School (USB), Cape Town, Republic of South Africa
Skarbek Graduate School of Business Economics, Warsaw, Poland
KEDGE Business School, Bordeaux and Marseille, France
Reims Management School, Reims, France
Antwerp Management School, Antwerpen, Belgium
Fordham University, New York, U.S.
Sellinger School of Business and Management, Loyola College of Maryland, Baltimore, Maryland, U.S.
Facultad de Economia – IQS, Barcelona, Spain
Kyiv Investment Management Institute, Ukraine
College of Management Law & Languages, Siauliai, Lithuania
HHL-Leipzig Graduate School of Management, Leipzig, Germany
IÉSEG School of Management, Lille – Paris, France
Eastern Michigan University, Michigan, U.S.
Warsaw School of Economics, Warsaw, Poland

A Team of PGDM second-year students from XIMB reached 4th place in the Rubicon International Business Case contest held in 2006 in Iserlohn, Germany. The team was the sole Asian finalist.

Research centres

Research centres at XIMB include:
 CII (Confederation of Indian Industry) – XIMB Centre of Excellence
 Centre for Development Research and Training
 Centre for Case Research
 Centre for EntrepreneurshiP
 Centre for Development of Small and Micro EnterpriseS
 Team Orissa Project Advisory Centre (TOPAX) 
 Centre for Resettlement and Rehabilitation and Corporate Social Responsibility

XIMB under XIM university publishes five journals: Vilakshan, Journal of Research Practice (JRP), Research World, and International.

Accreditation
XIMB along with SHRM and SRM which are collectively known as Faculty of Management at XIM University have been granted the South Asian Quality Assurance Systems (SAQS) accreditation by the Association of Management Development Institutions in South Asia (AMDISA) and the NBA Accreditation by the National Board of Accreditation.

Infrastructure
 Academic Block: XIMB has four administrative and academic buildings. The new academic block has a board room, conference room, and examination hall; all classrooms are air-conditioned and equipped with audio-video systems, overhead projectors, computers, and wireless hotspots. The auditorium seats 850 and is a venue for conventions and high-level forums.
 Library: The three-storied library has a collection of printed and electronic resources which includes books, journals, working papers, audiovisual resources, dissertations, annual reports of corporate houses, volumes of periodicals, and international online databases on management development studies and related topics.
 Residence: Students are required to reside on campus, in separate residences for men and women, with Wi-Fi throughout. The Studio apartment building has 113 furnished apartments for students, faculty, and visiting professionals. Some of the other apartment buildings (for men) are Cenderet, GR-I, and GR-II. For women, there are two residence buildings namely RMH and MTR.
 Sports: There are two floodlit tennis courts and a basketball court, indoor badminton court, volleyball court, jogging track, and facilities for indoor sports for students and faculty. The institute also has a multipurpose gymnasium open 24/7.
 Extension of campus: XIMB has started its first extension campus near Sundarpada jatani road in the outskirts of Bhubaneswar  named as XIM University where its existing programmes in Business Management, Rural Management & Human Resource Management are now delivered along with multiple new industry-oriented programmes. The XIM campus near Sundarpada, is a state of the art, digital campus spread over 35 acres of land. XIM University has started a number of next-generation courses at both undergraduate and post-graduate levels in areas such as Economics, sustainability, Public Policy, Urban Studies,  Computer Sciences etc.
Virtual classroom: XIMB's virtual classroom program reaches 100 cities.

Campus life
There are a number of student committees for the Institute and for student life. The Student Executive Council (SEC) is made up of students; it handles and controls all student activities and various committees.
          
XIMB has four core committees:
 Placement Committee
 IlluminatiX (the Media and PR Cell)
 Alumni Committee
 International Relations Committee 

Apart from this, there a number of functional committees:
 MAXIM: The Marketing Association of XIMB
 CONSTRAT: The Consulting and Strategy Consortium of XIMB
 X-FIN: The Finance Association of XIMB
 X-SYS: The Systems Association of XIMB
 X-OPS: The Operations Association of XIMB  

There are also a number of Interest committees, which include:
 SpeakUp: The Oratory Club
 XQuizzite: The Quizzing Society
 Spicmacay: Society for Promotion of Indian Classical Music and Culture Among Youth
 XPRESSIONS Steering Committee: The annual inter-B-school meet team
 SRC: Social Responsibility Cell, XIMB
 XStage: The Cultural Club, XIMB
 SportsCom: The Sports Committee of XIMB
 XSEED: The Entrepreneurship Development Cell, XIMB
 X-Lens: The Photography Committee of XIMB

Events

Business and cultural events include "Xpressions", an annual business strategy games festival organised by the students of XIMB. Xpressions 2011 included appearances from Lucky Ali, Jagjit Singh, Euphoria, and Jal.    "Celeblitz" is a celebrity night.

 Business Conclave
This three-day interactive session organised by X–Fin (the Finance Club), MAXIM (The Marketing Association), IlluminatiX (The Media & PR Cell)
 and XOps (the Operations Team) draws on experts from throughout India to share their views, experiences, and ideas with the students. It works towards increasing the awareness, interest, and practical knowledge of the students. Business Excellence Summit is also a flagship event held annually at XIMB since its inception in 2017. It's a three-day extravaganza which witnesses a legion of pivotal business leaders sharing insights and enlightening management students.

See also
 List of Jesuit sites

References

External links
XIMB Home Page

Jesuit universities and colleges in India
Business schools in Odisha
Universities and colleges in Bhubaneswar
Educational institutions established in 1987
1987 establishments in Orissa